British Champion Jockey could refer to:

British flat racing Champion Jockey
British jump racing Champion Jockey